Down in the Shacks Where the Satellite Dishes Grow is the second album by the American band the Judybats, released in 1992 by Sire Records. The single "Saturday" peaked at No. 21 on the Billboard Modern Rock Tracks chart.

Production and promotion 
Recorded in the summer of 1991, the album was produced by Richard Gottehrer and Jeffrey Lesser. "Animal Farm" is a cover of the Kinks song. Frontman Jeff Heiskell considered most of the songs to be autobiographical.

A music video was made for "Is Anything". The band opened for the Original Sins on several tour dates.

Critical reception

The Indianapolis Star stated: "The JudyBats' breezy, guitar-driven music is a 75-degree, sunny April day; its lyrics a lonely November in singer Jeff Heiskell's soul." The Washington Post wrote that "what really offsets Heiskell's dolorous, if often original and intriguing, lyrics are the band's abundant energy, shimmering harmonies and contagious choruses."

The Chicago Tribune considered the album to be "filled with vaguely arty but ultimately rather meaningless jangly guitar pop." The San Antonio Express-News opined that it "has a harder edge that the debut, though there is still plenty of guitar jangle."

Track listing 
All music by the Judybats, lyrics by Jeff Heiskell, except where otherwise indicated.

 "Our Story" – 4:34
 "She's Sad She Said" – 3:18
 "How It Is" – 4:27
 "Down in the Shacks Where the Satellite Dishes Grow" – 4:06
 "Margot Known as Missy" – 3:24
 "Witches' Night" – 6:26
 "Is Anything" – 2:55
 "Poor Bruised World" – 3:04
 "Animal Farm" (Ray Davies) – 3:34
 "Saturday" – 3:31
 "Lullaby~Weren't We Wild" – 4:26
 "When Things Get Slow Around Here" – 3:42

Personnel 
The Judybats
Jeff Heiskell – lead vocals
Ed Winters	– electric guitars
Peg Hambright – keyboards, violin, vocals
Timothy Stutz – bass guitar
Johnny Sughrue	– acoustic guitar, vocals
Kevin Jarvis – drums & percussion

Technical
Richard Gottehrer – co-producer
Jeffrey Lesser – co-producer, engineer
Chris Laidlaw – assistant engineer
Greg Calbi – mastering
Peg Hambright – design

References

Judybats albums
1992 albums
Sire Records albums